Monroe Township is one of twelve townships in Delaware County, Indiana. According to the 2010 census, its population was 3,729 and it contained 1,507 housing units.

Geography

Unincorporated towns
 Cowan
 Oakville
 Progress

Adjacent townships
 Center Township (north)
 Liberty Township (northeast)
 Perry Township (east)
 Prairie Township, Henry County (south)
 Jefferson Township, Henry County (southwest)
 Salem Township (west)
 Mount Pleasant Township (northwest)

Major highways
  U.S. Route 35
  Indiana State Road 3
  Indiana State Road 67

Cemeteries
The township contains three cemeteries: Fairview, Macedonia and Tomlinson.

References
 United States Census Bureau cartographic boundary files
 U.S. Board on Geographic Names

External links
 Indiana Township Association
 United Township Association of Indiana

Townships in Delaware County, Indiana
Townships in Indiana